The Bus Is Coming is a 1971 American drama film directed by Wendell James Franklin, starring Mike B. Simms and Burl Bullock.

Cast
 Mike B. Simms as Billy Mitchell
 Burl Bullock as Michael
 Stephanie Faulkner as Tanya
 Morgan Jones as Tim Naylor
 Robert Brubaker as Chief Jackson
 Sandra Reed as Miss Nickerson

Reception
Howard Thompson of The New York Times called the film "strong, probing and impressively balanced". TV Guide wrote that the film "manages to address the racial issues while telling an interesting, albeit melodramatic story."

Richard Leary of The Village Voice called the acting "amateurish", the direction "pedestrian", and the production "shoe-string". John Little of The Pittsburgh Press called the film "angry" and wrote that "the anger overcomes the effort". Sharon Scott of The Pittsburgh Courier wrote a negative review of the film.

References

External links
 
 The Bus is Coming at American Film Institute
 

American drama films
1971 drama films